Raw Deal is a 1977 Australian meat pie western film directed by Russell Hagg made by the company responsible for the TV series Cash and Company and Tandarra.

Plot
In the 1870s, the colonial administrator hires bounty hunter Palmer and gun salesman Ben to wipe out an army of Irish Catholic revolutionaries in their stronghold. Palmer and Ben recruit three gun men to help them and their mission is successful but when they go to get their payment they are trapped by treacherous officials. Ben and Palmer must fight their way to safety.

Cast
Gerard Kennedy as Palmer
Gus Mercurio as Ben
Rod Mullinar as Alex
Christopher Pate as Dick
Hu Pryce as Ned
John Cousins as Sir Charles
Michael Carman as Sir Frederick
Norman Yemm as O'Neil
Gary Day as Tyrone Leader
Briony Behets as Alex's Lady
Anne Scott-Pendlebury as Dick's Girl

Production
The movie was shot in Sunbury, Victoria and Mungo, New South Wales.

According to Filmink "The film uses Western tropes, but it makes some attempt to adapt to Australia – the plot revolves around the sectarianism of the time, which was a much bigger issue here than in the USA. There’s references to Guy Fawkes, and cricket."

Reception
The film was a commercial disappointment and failed to recover its costs.

Patrick Edgeworth later said he felt a key problem with the film was the lack of a strong female role.

Accolades

References

External links
 
Raw Deal at Oz Movies

Australian Western (genre) films
1977 Western (genre) films
Films set in colonial Australia
1977 films
1970s English-language films
1970s Australian films